Alexander Fleming (born March 19, 1994), professionally known as Black Atlass, is a Canadian singer, songwriter and model. His song, Paris, debuted in a Louis Vuitton campaign, and was also featured in a Saint Laurent fragrance ad. He was previously signed to XO/Republic Records and released his debut studio album, Pain & Pleasure, in 2018. He released his second studio album Dream Awake in 2020.

Early life 
Black Atlass was born in Montreal, Quebec. After his father got a new job his family settled in London, Ontario, where he grew up.

Career 
Black Atlass began his career in the music industry while he was still in high school.  He created an eponymous EP, The Black Atlass EP, in his parents' basement in 2012. The EP's single, Paris, was used by the luxury retailer, Louis Vuitton, to score a film celebrating their exhibit at the Musée Des Arts Décoratifs. The track was also featured in a Saint Laurent fragrance ad in 2013. The same year, Black Atlass was invited to the front row and dressed by Christian Dior's menswear designer Kris Van Assche for their spring/summer 2014 show in Paris.

He released his second EP, Young Bloods, in 2014, on Fool's Gold Records. To promote the EP, toured in support of the French artist Woodkid, with dates in Toronto, Montreal and across Europe. Woodkid also directed the music video for one of the EP's songs, "Jewels", which starred the model Anja Rubik. 

In the fall of 2016, Alexander Wang featured Black Atlass in his fashion campaign alongside Kylie Jenner, Vince Staples, Lexi Boling, Zoe Kravitz, A$AP Ferg, Big Sean, Metro Boomin, MØ, Skrillex, Tinashe, Tyga and others.

In 2018, he was signed to The Weeknd's record label XO, and released his debut studio album, Pain & Pleasure. In the same year, he collaborated with Jessie Reyez on the song "Sacrifice", which was featured on the Fifty Shades Freed soundtrack.

Black Atlass' second studio album, Dream Awake, was released on April 3, 2020. The album consists of 12 tracks. On July 1, 2022, he released the ‘side A’ of his EP “Infinite”, which was his first release independently via Black Atlass, Inc. since the expiration of his deal with XO/Republic.

Discography

Recognitions and nominations 
In April 2013, Black Atlass was recognized as Vogue's "Artist of the Week". His album Pain & Pleasure was nominated for a JUNO Award for "R&B/Soul Recording Of The Year" in 2019.

Personal life 
Black Atlass is interested in photography and graphic design, and originally intended to carry both as a profession after high school.

References 

Canadian hip hop singers
Singers from Montreal
XO (record label)
1994 births
Living people